Ross Williams may refer to:

Ross Williams (born 1962), Australian computer scientist and entrepreneur
Ross Williams, character in Experiment Alcatraz
Ross Williams (actor) in Gross Misconduct (film)
Ross Williams, founder of Global Personals

See also
Roger Ross Williams, American director, producer and writer
Tiffany Ross-Williams, American hurdler